A partial solar eclipse will occur on October 24, 2098. A solar eclipse occurs when the Moon passes between Earth and the Sun, thereby totally or partly obscuring the image of the Sun for a viewer on Earth. A partial solar eclipse occurs in the polar regions of the Earth when the center of the Moon's shadow misses the Earth.

This minor eclipse is the first solar eclipse of Saros cycle 164.

Related eclipses

Solar eclipses 2094–2098

References

External links 
 http://eclipse.gsfc.nasa.gov/SEplot/SEplot2051/SE2098Oct24P.GIF

Solar eclipse 2098 10 24
2098 10 24
2098 10 24